Coley Wallace (April 5, 1927 – January 30, 2005) was an American actor and heavyweight boxer who once outpointed Rocky Marciano in a very close split decision three-round amateur fight.

Although Wallace, a Jacksonville, FL native, had a respectable record as a professional (20-7-0), his claim to fame came in 1948 when, as an amateur, he once defeated in a very close split decision future heavyweight champion Rocky Marciano in the finals of the New York Golden Gloves Tournament. The decision was not welcomed by crowd and many considered it drawn. Wallace fought Ezzard Charles in his professional career, among others.

Wallace's contract was "owned" under the table by the notorious Frank "Blinky" Palermo, a member of the Philadelphia crime family. Palermo was imprisoned in 1961 for conspiracy and extortion for the covert ownership of prizefighters.

After boxing career, Wallace acted in four movies, twice portraying the boxer Joe Louis.

Wallace died on January 30, 2005, of heart failure in New York City.

Filmography 
The Joe Louis Story (1953) - Joe Louis
Carib Gold (1957) - Ryan
Marciano (1979 TV movie) - Joe Louis
Raging Bull (1980) - Joe Louis - Cerdan Fight
Rooftops (1989) - Lester (final film role)

References

External links 
 

1927 births
2005 deaths
Male actors from Florida
Boxers from Florida
Heavyweight boxers
National Golden Gloves champions
Sportspeople from Jacksonville, Florida
Winners of the United States Championship for amateur boxers
American male boxers
Rocky Marciano